Goopi Gawaiya Bagha Bajaiya is an Indian animated film directed by Shilpa Ranade. It is based on the characters Goopy and Bagha created by Satyajit Ray's grandfather Upendra Kishore Roychowdhury. The film is inspired from Goopy Gyne Bagha Byne, the first film from Goopy Gyne Bagha Byne trilogy. The film was released on 1 March 2019 in India.

Premise
Two blundering yet lovable musician protagonists meet ghosts, obtain boons, avert wars, marry princesses and help the common people live happily ever after.

Cast
 Manish Bhawan as Bagha 
 Rajeev Raj as Goopi
 Shailendra Pande as Ghost King
 Shahanawaz Pradhan
 Vishal Kumar as Ladoo
 Aditya Sharma

Release
The film had its world premiere at the Toronto International Film Festival on 7 September 2013. The film was also screened at 11th Mumbai International Film Festival on 17 October the same year. It was released theatrically in India on 1 March 2019.

Awards and nominations

See also
 Goopy Gyne Bagha Byne (film series)
 List of indian animated feature films

References

External links
 

2010s Hindi-language films
2013 films
Indian animated fantasy films
Indian children's films
Films based on short fiction
Films set in Asia
Indian fantasy adventure films